Kenneth Edward Edenfield (born March 18, 1967) is an American former professional baseball player who played two seasons for the California Angels of Major League Baseball (MLB).

References

1967 births
Living people
American expatriate baseball players in Canada
Baseball players from Georgia (U.S. state)
Boise Hawks players
California Angels players
Columbus Clippers players
Major League Baseball pitchers
Midland Angels players
Palm Springs Angels players
People from Jesup, Georgia
Quad Cities Angels players
Vancouver Canadians players
Western Kentucky Hilltoppers baseball players